Bait Husain (born 1933) is a Pakistani boxer. He competed in the men's welterweight event at the 1956 Summer Olympics.

References

1933 births
Living people
Pakistani male boxers
Olympic boxers of Pakistan
Boxers at the 1956 Summer Olympics
Place of birth missing (living people)
Asian Games medalists in boxing
Boxers at the 1958 Asian Games
Asian Games bronze medalists for Pakistan
Medalists at the 1958 Asian Games
Welterweight boxers
20th-century Pakistani people